Denise Page is a former New Zealand international lawn bowler.

Bowls career
Page has represented New Zealand at the Commonwealth Games, in the fours event at the 1986 Commonwealth Games.

She won gold and silver medal at the inaugural 1985 Asia Pacific Bowls Championships, in Tweed Heads.

She is a two times New Zealand champion winning the 1987 pairs and 1995 fours titles at the New Zealand National Bowls Championships.

References

New Zealand female bowls players
Living people
Bowls players at the 1986 Commonwealth Games
Year of birth missing (living people)